Sarah Tilghman Hughes (August 2, 1896 – April 23, 1985) was an American lawyer and federal judge who served on the United States District Court for the Northern District of Texas. She is best known as the judge who swore in Lyndon B. Johnson as President of the United States on Air Force One after John F. Kennedy was assassinated in Dallas on November 22, 1963. She was the first and only woman to have sworn in a US President. The photo depicting Hughes administering the oath of office to Johnson is widely viewed as the most famous photo ever taken aboard Air Force One.

Education and career

Born Sarah Augusta Tilghman in Baltimore, Maryland, she was the daughter of James Cooke and Elizabeth (Haughton) Tilghman. She went to high school at Western Female High School (now Western High School) in Baltimore, where she was elected president of the freshman class. Standing only five feet one-half inch at maturity, she was described by a classmate as "small but terrible". Her determined personality extended to the athletic field where she participated in intramural track and field, gymnastics, and basketball. Another instance of Hughes's strong personal discipline was seen in her habit of going to bed by 8 pm and getting up at 4 am, a habit she continued through much of her life. After graduating from Western High School, she attended Goucher College, an all women's college in central Baltimore very close to her home. She participated in athletics at Goucher College, and 'learned to lose without bitterness, to get up and try again, to never feel resentment,' a trait that would serve her well through many years of political victories and defeats. She graduated with an Artium Baccalaureus degree in 1917.

After graduating from college, Hughes taught science at Salem Academy in Winston-Salem, North Carolina for several years. She then returned to school to the study of law. In 1919 she moved to Washington, D.C. and attended The George Washington University Law School. She attended classes at night and during the day worked as a police officer. As a police officer, Hughes did not carry a gun or wear a police uniform because she worked to prevent crimes among women and girls, patrolling areas where female runaways and prostitutes were normally found. Her job was an expression of the progressive idea of rehabilitation instead of punishment. Hughes later credited this job with instilling in her a sense of commitment and responsibility to women and children. At that time she lived in a tent home near the Potomac River and commuted to the campus by canoe each evening. She graduated with a Bachelor of Laws in 1922.

In 1922, she moved to Dallas, Texas, with her husband, George Ernest Hughes, whom she had met in law school. Her husband quickly found employment after law school, but Sarah faced significant obstacles as a woman during a time in which law firms generally did not regard women as qualified. Eventually, the small firm of Priest, Herndon, and Ledbetter gave her a rent-free space and even referred some cases to her in exchange for her services as a receptionist. As her practice grew and became more successful, she became increasingly active in local women's organizations. She joined the Zonta Club, the Business and Professional Women's Club, the Dallas Women's Political League, the League of Women Voters, YWCA, Dallas College Club, and the American Association of University Women. Hughes served as Chair of the AAUW Committee on the Economic and Legal Status of Women, advocating equal pay jury service for women, and improved status and recognition for women in the Armed Services. She practiced law for eight years in Dallas before becoming involved in politics, first being elected in 1930 to three terms in the Texas House of Representatives as a Democrat. In 1935, Hughes accepted an appointment as a state judge from Governor James V. Allred for the Fourteenth District Court in Dallas, becoming the state's first female district judge. In 1936 she was elected to the same post. She was re-elected six more times and remained in that post until 1961.

Federal judicial service

Hughes received a recess appointment from President John F. Kennedy on October 5, 1961, to the United States District Court for the Northern District of Texas, to a new seat authorized by 75 Stat. 80. She was nominated to the same position by President Kennedy on January 15, 1962. She was confirmed by the United States Senate on March 16, 1962, and received her commission on March 17, 1962. She was the only female judge appointed by President Kennedy, the first female federal judge in Texas and the third female to serve in the federal judiciary. She assumed senior status on August 4, 1975. Her service terminated on April 23, 1985, due to her death.

Circumstances of appointment

The appointment almost did not happen, according to the historian Robert Caro, because the Kennedy administration thought that Hughes was "too old" and they were seeking younger jurists for the lifetime tenure afforded under Article III for federal judgeships. Hughes had been a "longtime Johnson ally," and as vice president, Johnson had asked Robert F. Kennedy, the attorney general of the United States and brother of President John F. Kennedy, "to nominate Mrs. Hughes" for the Federal bench, but the United States Justice Department turned him down. Johnson then offered the job to another attorney. However, Hughes was also an ally of the speaker of the House, Sam Rayburn, who held up a bill important to Robert Kennedy until Hughes' appointment was announced. Johnson was outraged at the chain of events because it appeared to be an intentional attempt to insult him, and made him look like the "biggest liar and fool in the history of the State of Texas".  President Kennedy's White House appointments secretary called it a "terrible mistake", citing negligence on the part of Kennedy's staff. The story of how Hughes received her appointment made the rounds of Washington, D.C. insiders, including the political gossip columnists Evans and Novak, which hurt Johnson's reputation for political effectiveness.  Historian Steven Gillon agrees with Caro's story, although it was not cross-cited.

Women on juries

Hughes was concerned over the ineligibility of women in Texas to serve on juries even though they had the right to vote. She and Helen Edmunds Moore coauthored a proposed amendment that would allow women on juries in Texas, but the bill failed and went nowhere. Despite defeat, Hughes became closely identified with this cause and few people were recognized as working harder for this right. Due in to part to Hughes's work, Texas women secured the right to serve on juries in 1954.

Administering the oath of office

Two years into her tenure as a federal district judge, on November 22, 1963, Hughes was called upon to administer the oath of office to Lyndon B. Johnson after the assassination of President Kennedy, a task usually performed by the Chief Justice of the United States.  According to an interview with Barefoot Sanders, who was United States Attorney for the Northern District of Texas at the time:

Hughes believed that President Johnson chose her to administer the oath of office due to their friendship, and because Johnson was not pleased with other federal judges in Dallas. Because of this, Hughes was the most suitable choice. Sanders and Hughes no doubt believed those rationales, but Johnson had other reasons to choose her, according to Caro: "He knew who he wanted - and she was in Dallas." Citing another historian, Max Holland, Caro noted that the circumstances surrounding Hughes's appointment meant that she "'personified Johnson's utter powerlessness'" when he was vice president. The new president ordered his staff, "'Get Sarah Hughes ... Find her.'" Hughes was found and driven to Love Field, while Air Force One—and thus the inauguration of the new president—was held up just for her. Caro asserts that Johnson, in his insecurities, chose Hughes to show to the world that he was now powerful. Two other historians (Holland and Gillen) agree with Caro's assessment that Johnson was still upset that he'd not been consulted on Hughes's appointment in the first place, so it was a way to placate his ego. On the other hand, Johnson needed to make sure that "the swearing-in take place at the earliest possible moment ... to demonstrate, quickly, continuity and stability to the nation and the world. ... "  Johnson used the "few minutes to spare" while waiting for Hughes to arrive to plead to Kennedy's staffers to stay awhile for the transition. Finally, she arrived, along with the media and Jackie Kennedy; only then the swearing-in could take place. Hughes noted that Jackie's "eyes 'were cast down'" when Johnson nodded to the judge to start the oath of office.

Other significant contributions

Throughout her lifetime, Sarah Hughes was known for her speedy and impartial administration. In 1950, she assisted in establishing Dallas's first juvenile detention center.

Hughes was involved in multiple court decisions, including Roe v. Wade, Shultz v. Brookhaven General Hospital, and Taylor v. Sterrett. Hughes was a member of the three-judge panel that first heard the case of Roe v. Wade; the panel's decision was subsequently affirmed by the Supreme Court of the United States. In Taylor v. Sterrett, she argued to upgrade prisoner treatment in the Dallas County jail. Hughes noted that "the Dallas County Jail was very much in need of change. It was in deplorable condition, and [she] think[s], that under [her] jurisdiction, it became one of the best jails in the whole United States."

Later years and death

Hughes retired from the active federal bench in 1975, though she continued to work as a judge with senior status until 1982. A close friend of Lyndon Johnson and his family, Hughes participated in his inauguration in 1965, took part in the book signing of Lady Bird Johnson's White House memoirs, and participated in the dedication of the Lyndon Baines Johnson Library and Museum. The dress Hughes wore during the swearing in on Air Force One was donated to a wax museum in Grand Prairie, Texas, but it was destroyed in a fire in 1988. In 1982, Hughes suffered a debilitating stroke which confined her to a nursing home in Dallas. She died three years later on April 23, 1985.

The Sarah T. Hughes Field Politics Center at Hughes' alma mater, Goucher College, founded in the 1950s with a grant from the Maurice and Laura Falk Foundation, is named in her honor. The special collections reading room of the University of North Texas Libraries is also named in her honor.

Bibliography

 La Forte, Robert S. "Hughes, Sarah Tilghman." Handbook of Texas Online. Accessed December 1, 2013.
 La Forte, Robert S. and Richard Himmel. "Sarah T. Hughes, John F. Kennedy, and the Johnson Inaugural, 1963." East Texas Historical Journal 27, no. 2 (1989): 35–41.
 Payne, Darwin. Indomitable Sarah: The Life of Judge Sarah T. Hughes. Dallas: Southern Methodist University Press, 2004.
 Riddlesperger, James W. "Sarah T. Hughes." Master's thesis, North Texas State University, 1980.

See also
List of first women lawyers and judges in Texas

References

External links
 
 More photos of the taking of the oath
 The Sarah T. Hughes Center for Field Politics at Goucher College
 Sarah T. Hughes Archive at University of North Texas
 Indomitable Sarah: The Life of Judge Sarah T. Hughes by Darwin Payne (Texas A&M University Press)
 
 Oral History Interview with Sarah T. Hughes, from the Lyndon Baines Johnson Library
  Women in Texas History
 Description of Judge Hughes

1896 births
1985 deaths
20th-century American judges
20th-century American lawyers
20th-century American women lawyers
20th-century American women judges
American Episcopalians
American women police officers
George Washington University Law School alumni
Goucher College alumni
Judges of the United States District Court for the Northern District of Texas
Lawyers from Baltimore
Lawyers from Dallas
Democratic Party members of the Texas House of Representatives
Metropolitan Police Department of the District of Columbia officers
People associated with the assassination of John F. Kennedy
Politicians from Baltimore
Politicians from Dallas
Texas state court judges
United States district court judges appointed by John F. Kennedy
Women state legislators in Texas